Events from the year 1745 in art.

Events
Hieronimo Miani completes the decoration of Christiansborg Palace in Copenhagen.

Works
Andien de Clermont – Monkey Room ceiling, Kirtlington Park, Oxfordshire, England
William Hogarth
Captain Lord George Graham in his Cabin
David Garrick as Richard III
Allan Ramsay – Lost portrait of Charles Edward Stuart

Births
 February 2 – John Nichols (printer), English printer and author (died 1826)
 March 5 – Christina Elisabeth Carowsky, Swedish portrait painter (died 1797)
 March 29 – John Russell, English portrait painter (died 1806)
 May 5 – Carl August Ehrensvärd, Swedish naval officer, painter, author and neo-classical architect (died 1800)
 May 12 – Jens Juel, Danish portrait painter (died 1802)
 June 16 – Sigmund Freudenberger, Swiss painter (died 1801)
 June 26 – Nils Schillmark, Swedish-born painter who lived and worked in Finland (died 1804)
 July 6 – Jean-Joseph Taillasson, French painter (died 1809)
 August 3 – Domenico Pozzi, Swiss painter (died 1796)
 October 6 – Franciszek Smuglewicz, Polish draughtsman and painter (died 1807)
 date unknown
 Luigi Acquisti, Italian sculptor mainly known for his works in the neoclassical style (died 1823)
 Pyotr Drozhdin, Russian painter] (died 1805)
 Anne Forbes, Scottish portrait painter (died 1834)
 Gim Hongdo, Korean painter of the late Joseon period (died 1806)
 Anton Hickel, Czech painter (died 1798)
 Yi In-mun, Korean court painter of the late Joseon Dynasty, primarily of landscapes (died 1821)
 Francis Jukes, English etcher, engraver and publisher (died 1812)
 Pierre Lacour, French painter (died 1814)
 Wincenty de Lesseur, Polish portrait painter (died 1813)
 Uragami Gyokudo, Japanese musician, painter, poet and calligrapher (died 1820)
 1745/1749: Gottlieb Welté, German etcher and landscape painter (died 1792)

Deaths
February 23 – Joseph Effner, German architect and interior decorator (born 1687)
May 28 – Jonathan Richardson, English portrait painter, writer on art and collector (born 1667)
June 13 – Domenico Antonio Vaccaro, Italian painter, sculptor and architect (born 1678)
June 28 – Giovanni Maria delle Piane, court painter (born 1660)
September 14 – Martino Altomonte, Italian fresco painter (born 1657)
December 19 – Jean-Baptiste van Loo, Dutch painter (born 1684)
date unknown
Pietro Giovanni Abbati, Italian set designer, painter and engraver (born 1683)
Claude Du Bosc, French engraver (born 1682)
Mehmet Emin Tokadi, Ottoman Sufi saint, writer, calligrapher, and scholar (born 1664)
Willem Van der Hagen, Dutch painter who settled in Ireland, founder of the Irish school of landscape painting (born unknown)
probable – Johan Richter, painter of landscapes or vedute of Venice (born 1665)

 
Years of the 18th century in art
1740s in art